Potosina 200 is a NASCAR Toyota Series race. San Luis Potosí is the venue with most races of NCS with 18. Germán Quiroga is the most successful driver with 5 victories, 4 in the new oval.

History

The first race was held in the Autodrómo San Luis 400. This is a road course. In 2005, The older Autódromo Potosino was remodeled in an oval track.

Winners

Records

Most Wins

References

NASCAR Mexico Series races
NASCAR races at the Autódromo San Luis 400
NASCAR races at Autódromo Potosino